Jem, also known as Jem and the Holograms, is an American animated musical television series that ran from 1985 to 1988. The series is about record company owner Jerrica Benton, her singer alter-ego Jem, and the adventures of Jem and her band the Holograms.

The series was a joint collaboration by Hasbro, Sunbow Productions and Marvel Productions, the same team responsible for G.I. Joe and Transformers. The creator of the series, Christy Marx, had also been a staff writer for the aforementioned programs. The animation for most of the episodes was provided by Japanese animation studio Toei Animation with some provided by South Korean studio AKOM.

Plot

The series revolves around Jerrica Benton, the owner and manager of Starlight Music, and her alter-ego Jem, lead singer of the rock group the Holograms. Jerrica adopts the persona of Jem with the help of a holographic computer, known as Synergy, which was built by Jerrica's father to be "the ultimate audio-visual entertainment synthesizer" and is bequeathed to her after his death. Jerrica is able to command Synergy to project the hologram of Jem over herself by means of the remote micro-projectors in her earrings, thus disguising her features and clothing, enabling her to assume the Jem persona. Jem, through the use of her earrings, is also able to project holograms around her and uses this ability throughout the series to avoid danger and provide special effects for the performances of her group.

The Holograms consists of Kimber Benton, Jerrica's younger sister, keyboardist, and main songwriter for the band; Aja Leith, Asian-American guitarist; Shana Elmsford, African-American, who plays the synth drums. Aja and Shana are also childhood friends, and adopted foster sisters of Jerrica and Kimber, having lived with the Benton family since they were young. Shana briefly leaves the group to pursue a career in fashion, at which point a new Latina character, Carmen "Raya" Alonso, is introduced as her replacement. The Holograms are aware of Jem's secret identity and the existence of Synergy when the series begins, while Raya is made aware unintentionally shortly before joining the group. Upon her return to the Holograms, Shana becomes the band's bassist.

The Holograms have two rival bands: the Misfits and the Stingers:

 The Misfits (no relation to the real-world band Misfits) consist of petulant rich girl Pizzazz (real name Phyllis Gabor) and her group: no-nonsense guitarist Roxy (Roxanne Pelligrini) and kind-hearted, sensitive keytar player Stormer (Mary Phillips). They are joined later by the manipulative British saxophonist Jetta (Sheila Burns).
 The Stingers debut in the third season when they cause disruptions for both groups by becoming co-owners of Stinger Sound with Eric Raymond. Originally from Germany, the Stingers are composed of egotistical lead singer Riot (Rory Llewelyn), guitarist/con artist Rapture (Phoebe Ashe), and keyboardist Minx (Ingrid Kruger). The real names of Minx and Rapture are not disclosed in any of the installments.

Episodes of the series frequently revolve around Jerrica's efforts to keep her two identities separate, protect Synergy from those who might exploit the holographic technology, and support the twelve foster children known as the Starlight Girls who live with her and the Holograms. The Misfits frequently attempt to upstage Jem and the Holograms' endeavors, often nearly resulting in physical harm to members of the group. This rivalry is encouraged and manipulated by their manager and central villain in the series, Eric Raymond, the former half-owner of Starlight Music who runs Misfits Music (later Stinger Sound) while working under Pizzazz's father, Harvey Gabor.

During the series, Eric Raymond constantly plots to become owner of Starlight Music and get revenge on Jem and the Holograms for having cost him control of the company. Jerrica also deals with a complex and emotionally draining faux-love triangle involving her alter identity, Jem, and Rio Pacheco, Jerrica's longtime boyfriend. Rio romantically pursues both women, not knowing they are one and the same. Later in the series, Jem is also romantically sought after by Riot, who becomes infatuated with her – adding further complications to her relationships.

In the final episode of the series, the Misfits and Jem declare a truce when Ba Nee, one of the most troubled foster girls in Starlight House, is claimed by her long-lost father. Her father is found by Jem and the Holograms with the help of Riot's father. Riot's relationship with his father is mended with the help of Jem.

Characters

Episodes

Production

Conception and staffing
Hasbro hired advertising agency Griffin-Bacal Advertising, the founders of Sunbow Productions, to create the 65-episode animation series. Griffin-Bacal (Sunbow), as well as Marvel Productions, had previously created the successful G.I. Joe series for Hasbro. G.I. Joe writer Christy Marx was hired to create the series based on the line of dolls and the original concept, which consisted of the two girl bands, Synergy, the boyfriend Rio, and the Rockin' Roadster. Marx created the full character biographies and relationships, including the love triangle aspect between Rio and Jerrica Benton/Jem, Starlight Music and Starlight House, the Starlight Girls, the villain Eric Raymond and various secondary characters. Later, Marx was asked to develop new characters as they were introduced.

Marx wrote 23 of the 65 episodes. Other writers for the series included Cary Bates, Greg Weisman, Paul Dini, Buzz Dixon, Ellen Guon, Steve Mitchell, Michael Reaves, David Wise, Marv Wolfman, Mary Skrenes, Beth Bornstein, Roger Slifer, Richard Merwin, Sandy Fries, Cheri Wilkerson, Misty Stewart-Taggart, George Arthur Bloom, Jina Bacarr, Barbara Petty, Chris Pelzer, Michael Charles Hill, Eric Early, Clare Noto, Carla Conway and Evelyn A. R. Gabai.

The executive producers were Joe Bacal, Jay Bacal, Tom Griffin and Margaret Loesch. The story editor was Roger Slifer and Christy Marx featuring industry veteran Wally Burr as the series' voice director. The series' directors and supervising animators included many veterans of the DePatie-Freleng cartoon studio including Gerry Chiniquy, John Gibbs, Norm McCabe, Warren Batchelder and Tom Ray.

Casting
Samantha Newark provided the speaking voices of Jem and Jerrica. Despite having toured as a child singer in Africa, she did not do the singing for Jem. The voiceover cast never auditioned for the music side of the series and vice versa. The music for Jem was all cast and recorded in New York and Atlanta and the voiceover actors were cast and recorded in Burbank, California. They matched the speaking voices of the cast to the singing voices. Britta Phillips, who had never before worked professionally as a singer, was cast as the singing voice of Jem after obtaining an audition through her father who worked on jingles in New York. The initial take from the audition was used as the first opening theme song, "Truly Outrageous". The remaining Holograms speaking voices were provided by Cathianne Blore (Kimber Benton/Aja Leith), Cindy McGee (Shana Elmsford), and Linda Dangcil (Carmen 'Raya' Alonso).

The Misfits' speaking voices were provided by Patricia Alice Albrecht (Phyllis "Pizzazz" Gabor), Samantha Paris/Bobbie Block (Roxanne "Roxy" Pellegrini), Susan Blu (Mary "Stormer" Phillips), and Louise Dorsey (Sheila "Jetta" Burns), the daughter of Engelbert Humperdinck. Ellen Bernfeld provided the singing voice of Pizzazz.

The Stingers' speaking voices were provided by Townsend Coleman (Rory "Riot" Llewelyn), Ellen Gerstell (Phoebe "Rapture" Ashe), and Kath Soucie (Ingrid "Minx" Kruger). Gordon Grody, a vocal coach who later worked with Lady Gaga, provided the singing voice for Riot.

Other notable cast members included Charlie Adler, who had already had a lengthy voice-over career, as the central villain Eric Raymond. He also provided the voices of both of Eric's major henchmen Zipper and Techrat. Vicki Sue Robinson, famous for the 1970s discothèque-oriented hit "Turn the Beat Around", provided the singing voices of both Rapture and Minx. Ari Gold, pop singer and songwriter, gave the singing voice of Ba Nee.

Music

The inclusion of music videos in Jem was a result of the success and popularity of MTV (Music Television) at the time, which began airing four years prior. The placement of the songs throughout each episode was done to complement the story and the use of music videos in the show was considered "radical" for the time. The show contains a total of 187 music videos with 151 unique songs.

The series' format called for three fully produced songs for the featured music videos in each episode. Anne Bryant composed the music. Lyrics for the show's featured songs were written by Barry Harman. The theme song "JEMTruly, Truly, Truly Outrageous" was the opening and closing theme for the show until late 1987, when Bryant's second theme, "JEM GIRLS" became the series' opening theme for the majority of episodes and "JEMTruly, Truly, Truly Outrageous" was kept as the show's permanent closing theme. Music videos featured an "in-your-face" style that was directed at the viewer or the more traditional style. The music videos paralleled the style of rock videos found on MTV at the time featuring fast editing, a quick pace, and special effects.

Ellen Bernfeld, performing as Pizzazz, Britta Phillips, performing as Jem, and Gordon Grody, performing as Riot, the lead singer of the Stingers, along with Diva Gray, Florence Warner and Angela Capelli were the voices of the pop, funk and punk electronica productions, supported by Britta Phillips's father, pianist Peter Phillips, and by guitarist Steve Bill, bassist Tom Barney and set drummer and electronic drum programmer Tom Oldakowski. Anne Bryant, who chose the singers and musicians, created a pure young pop sound for Jem and the Holograms supported by acoustic instruments. The sound for the Misfits was crafted as strictly electronic other than the addition of guitars and an occasional sax solo when the character of Jetta was introduced into the Misfits. This was done to create an identifiable punk electronica style in stark contrast to their rival singing groups. In season three, Bryant introduced the slower, smooth, sexy/funky groove for the third group that entered the show, the Stingers.

No official Jem soundtrack was ever released; however, many of the songs from the first season were released on cassette with dolls or play-sets.

Reception
Jem was the #1 Nielsen rated syndicated cartoon series in November 1986, and in 1987, it was the third most watched children's program in syndication with 2.5 million viewers weekly. Jem has aired in multiple countries including Australia, Canada, United Kingdom, West Germany, Netherlands, United States, Italy and France. The show was nominated for the Young Artist Award twice, once in 1986 for "Exceptional Young Actresses in Animation: Series, Specials, or Film Features" for Samantha Newark's performance, then in 1988 for "Best Animation Series".

The long-standing popularity of Mattel's Barbie franchise led to a competition between Hasbro's Jem product line and Barbie and the Rockers, a similar product line by Mattel. This resulted in reduced sales for both products. Hasbro discontinued the Jem toyline at the end of 1987 after it failed to meet sales expectations but, despite this, the series continued production and aired until 1988. Jem was partially released on DVD in multiple countries, with a complete set available for the first time in 2011. The same year, Jem began airing on The Hub in the United States, causing a significant increase in the ratings for the channel. It also aired on Teletoon Retro in Canada.

Home media

Current status of the franchise

Christy Marx has long expressed a desire to make a modern-day revival of the animated series, but stated in a 2004 interview that there are a great deal of complications concerning the rights to the Jem properties.

Reruns
After almost 20 years, since last airing in the United States in 1993 on the USA Network (in re-runs), Jem returned to syndication. The series aired reruns on The Hub Network/Discovery Family from May 31, 2011, to November 15, 2015.

On July 25, 2011, Teletoon Retro, a Canadian channel dedicated to cartoons, announced that Jem would be part of its fall 2011 lineup. On April 5, 2012, Hasbro announced that Jem, along with several other Hasbro franchises, will be available on Netflix.

Dolls
On September 8, 2011, Hasbro issued a press release announcing its attendance at the 2011 New York Comic Con convention, which ran from October 13 to October 16. The press release stated that Hasbro would be showing new and upcoming products from its toy lines at its booth, including Jem and the Holograms.

On June 27, 2012, Integrity Toys, Inc. announced their plans to release a brand-new series of collectible fashion dolls based on the TV series. The special edition Hollywood Jem doll became available at the Hasbro Toy Shop booth during Comic-Con International in San Diego at an approximate retail price of $135. The Jem doll sold out on day two of the convention.

On October 5, 2012, the four (then-upcoming) dolls in the new Integrity Toys limited edition collectible line were presented with pictures: Classic Jem, Jerrica Benton, Synergy and Rio Pacheco. The suggested retail price is US$119 and they began shipping in late November 2012; pre-orders were accepted via Integrity Toys' network of authorized dealers. As of October 2016, Integrity Toys has produced over forty different dolls based on the classic show.

Comics
In 2011, Hasbro released a one-off comic book titled Unit:E as an exclusive at the New York Comic-Con; this was created by "HasLab" as a potential multi-brand crossover platform. The plot depicted Synergy, now an alien artificial intelligence, assisting the descendant of Acroyear and a Biotron from Micronauts in searching for heroes to help him combat Baron Karza. She shows them characters from G.I. Joe, Transformers, Battleship Galaxies, Stretch Armstrong, Action Man, M.A.S.K. and Candy Land among others. Jerrica herself is shown as not having taken up the Jem identity yet, but will eventually compose the "Music of the Spheres" (presumably with Synergy's aid). The comic was never followed up.

The Jem comic book was released by IDW in March 2015: written by Kelly Thompson, art by Sophie Campbell and colors by M. Victoria Robado. The comic book offers a modern re-imagining of the series with new character designs and different situations, such as the Holograms and the Misfits being unsigned bands at the start with Eric Raymond being hired as the Misfits' manager during the second story arc. In addition, Kimber and Stormer begin a romantic relationship. As of Issue #16, which is Campbell's final issue as regular artist, The Stingers have been introduced to the series with Raya featured as a fourth member of the band. The title's current status within the new Hasbro Comic Book Universe (consisting of several new or relaunched titles, using the IDW Transformers comics as the backbone for a cohesive universe) has been somewhat erratic; IDW writers have generally indicated that, while characters from Jem will not show up in crossovers (including the Revolution mini-series that launched the universe), they do exist and will receive occasional references. The series ended on June 14, 2017, with issue #26, but a six-issue miniseries--Jem & the Holograms: Infinite #1 and Jem & the Holograms: Misfits Infinite #1 was released later in the month.

A one-shot Jem and the Holograms: IDW 20/20 was published in January 2019 as part of IDW 20/20 which celebrated the 20th anniversary of IDW Publishing. The comic takes place 20 years after the final issue of the ongoing comic.

Film

After the success of G.I. Joe and Transformers films, Hasbro began considering a live-action film adaptation or a new incarnation of the animated series with Universal Pictures, with which Hasbro had signed a six-film contract in 2010.

On March 20, 2014, a live-action motion picture adaptation of Jem and the Holograms was announced, to be directed by Jon M. Chu. Filming on the production began in April 2014. On April 24, it was announced that Aubrey Peeples had been cast as Jem, with Stefanie Scott as Kimber, Hayley Kiyoko as Aja and Aurora Perrineau  as Shana. On April 30, 2014, actor Ryan Guzman was cast as Rio. On May 20, Juliette Lewis and Molly Ringwald joined the film. The film was theatrically released on October 23, 2015; it received generally negative reviews from critics and fans, with criticism targeted at the angsty teen drama, strayed too far from the source material as well as original series fan content being manipulated into reaction to the in-film characters. It was a box office bomb, grossing less than half its $5 million budget, and was removed from theaters by Universal after two weeks. SF Weekly criticized the fan backlash as entitlement.

Music
Hasbro Studios with Legacy Recordings released its first non-soundtrack album, Truly Outrageous: A Tribute to Starlight Records on August 7, 2015. The record was part of the promotion of the Jem film. The album consisted of original songs that only had the titles and sometimes a few lyrics in common with the Jem TV series songs. This release was digital only.

References

External links

 
 
 Jem and the Holograms at Don Markstein's Toonopedia. Archived from the original on October 8, 2016.

1985 American television series debuts
1988 American television series endings
1980s American animated television series
1980s American romance television series
1980s American science fiction television series
1980s toys
First-run syndicated television programs in the United States
Television series by Marvel Productions
American children's animated musical television series
American children's animated science fiction television series
American children's animated supernatural television series
Animated musical groups
Fictional musical groups
English-language television shows
Television series by Hasbro Studios
Television shows set in Los Angeles
Super Sunday (TV series)
Fashion dolls
Holography in television
Animated television series about robots
Television series about fictional musicians
Television shows based on Hasbro toys
Television series by Sunbow Entertainment
Television series created by Christy Marx
Animated romance television series
Television series by Claster Television
Toei Animation television